

Events
Joseph Amato takes over as head of the Milwaukee crime family, a subordinate family to the Chicago Outfit
Thomas Joseph McGinty, a Cleveland bootlegger and fight promoter, is indicted with two other family members by a federal grand jury and charged with operating "a gigantic wholesale and retail conspiracy" through his saloon. After serving eighteen months at Atlanta Federal Penitentiary, he resumes his bootlegging activities. 
Walter Stevens, a long-time Chicago gangster and labor slugger credited with the deaths of over 60 men, retires as a gunman for the Torrio-Capone organization where he lives peacefully until his death in 1939.
Joseph Bonanno, future founder of the Bonanno crime family, arrives in New York from Sicily.
A tong war breaks out between the On Leong and Hip Sing tongs after several members of the On Leongs defect to the Hip Sings with a large amount of money. 
April 1 – Frank Capone, brother of Al Capone, is killed by police during the fighting which broke out while leading around 200 gunmen into Cicero, Illinois during the 1924 Chicago Elections in support of Mafia backed Republican politicians. 
November 10 – Chicago North Side Gang leader Dean O'Banion is killed when three unidentified men enter his flower shop and shoot him several times. This begins a five-year gang war between the North Side Gang, under Hymie Weiss, against Al Capone's Chicago Outfit that would end with the St. Valentine's Day Massacre, in 1929.

Births
April 2 – Vito Ciancimino, Sicilian mobster and Palermo mayor
April 21 – Philip Testa "The Chicken Man", Philadelphia crime family boss
May 12 – Michele Greco "The Pope", Sicilian Mafia boss

Deaths
April 1 – Frank Capone, Chicago Outfit member 
September 7 – Jerry O'Connor, Southside O'Donnell gunman 
November 10 – Dean O'Banion, North Side Gang leader

References 

Organized crime
Years in organized crime